Bandi may refer to:

People with the name
 Bandi (writer), North Korean fiction writer, born 1950
 Bandi Rajan Babu (9 February 1938 – 25 August 2011), an Indian photographer
 Bandi Yadagiri, Indian revolutionary poet
 Philipp Bandi (born 1977), Swiss track and field athlete

Other uses
 Gbandi (or Bandi), people of Liberia and Guinea
 Gbandi language (or Bandi), a Mande language spoken by that people
 Bandi River, a tributary of the Luni River
 Bandi (jacket), a vest-jacket worn in South Asia
 Bandi (Star Trek), a fictional race in Star Trek

See also
 Bandai (disambiguation)
 Bandhi, a town of Shaheed Benazir Abad District of Sindh, Pakistan
 Bandi Atmakur, a village and a Mandal in Kurnool district in the state of Andhra Pradesh in India
 Bandy (disambiguation)

Language and nationality disambiguation pages